The Caledonian Railway 179 Class (nicknamed Oban bogie) was a class of 4-4-0 steam locomotives designed by  George Brittain for the Caledonian Railway (CR) and introduced in 1882.

All ten were built by Dübs and Company in 1882; they came with 4-wheel tenders to reduce the overall length in order to fit on the turntables. They were rebuilt and reboilered between 1898 and 1901. They were placed on the duplicate list (by adding 1000 to their original fleet number) between 1913 and 1914. 

Two locomotives (1184 and 1185) were withdrawn in 1922. Eight survived into the ownership of the London, Midland and Scottish Railway (LMS) in 1923; who allocated them fleet numbers 14100–14107, but only three (14100/03/05) were renumbered. All had been withdrawn by 1930.

References

179
4-4-0 locomotives
Railway locomotives introduced in 1882
Standard gauge steam locomotives of Great Britain